Juan Manuel Ferreira Fernández (born 24 September 1992) was an Uruguayan footballer.

In 2015, he played for Coquimbo Unido.

References
 
 

1992 births
Living people
Uruguayan footballers
Uruguayan expatriate footballers
Deportivo Maldonado players
Coquimbo Unido footballers
Primera B de Chile players
Expatriate footballers in Chile
Association football midfielders